

Events
End of the reign of Polydectes, king of Sparta from 830 BC.
Beginning of the reign of Eunomus, king of Sparta until 780 BC.
Emergence of the first communities settled in the Chincha Valley (Peru), pertaining to Paracas culture in the south coast of Peru.
End of Period IVB, Hasanlu is completely destroyed by a fire.
The Greek Colonization of the Mediterranean & Black Sea.
Archaic period of Greece ( - 500 BCE).
Homer of Greece writes his Iliad and Odyssey. ( - 700 BCE)
Assyrian army makes a  use of the new technology by which iron can be hardened into steel suitable for weapons.
Earliest surviving sundial is in use in Egypt.
Beginning of Iron Age in Britain (until 43 AD).

Deaths
Xiong Xun, monarch of the state of Chu during the Western Zhou Dynasty of ancient China.
Hasanlu Lovers, pair of human remains found at Teppe Hasanlu, possibly a couple.

References

Gallery